The Helen and Stan Vine Canadian Jewish Book Awards were a Canadian program of literary awards, managed, produced and presented annually by the Koffler Centre of the Arts to works judged to be the year's best works of literature by Jewish Canadian writers or on Jewish cultural and historical topics. 

In December 2014, The Koffler Centre of the Arts announced that the Awards were being "put on hiatus for 2015 and will resume, invigorated and reinvented, in 2016" as the Koffler recalibrates and revamps several of its current programs. In its place, a group of jury members formed the Canadian Jewish Literary Awards for 2015.

In February 2016, after a one-year hiatus, the Koffler Centre of the Arts relaunched the awards as the Vine Awards for Canadian Jewish Literature. 

The new awards have five categories, each with a $10,000 prize.

 Fiction
 Non-Fiction
 History
 Young Adult/Children's Literature
 Poetry (awarded every three years)

List of winners of the Canadian Jewish Book Awards (1989 - 2017)

1989
Jewish Book Committee Award: Szloma Renglich, When Paupers Dance
Joseph Tannenbaum Award: Michael R. Marrus, The Holocaust in History

1990
Yiddish Literature: Simcha Simkhovitch, Tzaar un Treist
Excellence in Scholarship on a Canadian Jewish Subject: Michael Greenstein, Third Solitudes: Tradition and Discontinuity in Jewish Canadian Literature
Creative Writing: J. J. Steinfeld, Forms of Captivity and Escape
Joseph Tanenbaum Holocaust Book Award: Harold Troper and Morton Weinfeld, Old Wounds: Jews, Ukrainians and the Hunt for Nazi War Criminals in Canada

1991
Penina Rubinoff Memorial Award for Rabbinic Scholarship: Martin Lockshin, Rabbi Samuel Ben Meir's Commentary on Genesis
Non-fiction: Miriam Waddington, Apartment Seven: Essays Selected and New
Poetry: Kenneth Sherman, Jackson's Point
Joseph Tanenbaum Holocaust Book Award: Ibolya Grossman, An Ordinary Woman in Extraordinary Times

1992
Penina Rubinoff Memorial Award for Biblical and Rabbinic Scholarship: Rabbi Gedalia Felder, Yasodei Yeshurun: A Collection of Comments and Notes on Masechet Avat
Book Committee Award for Yiddish: Peretz Miransky, A Zemer Fun Demer
The Book Committee Award for Creative Writing (Fiction): Morley Torgov, Saint Farb's Day
The Izzy and Betty Kirshenbaum Foundation Award for Poetry: Simcha Simkhovitch, Selected Poems
Literary Criticism: Rachel Feldhay Brenner, A.M.Klein: The Father of Canadian Jewish Literature

1993
Penina Rubinoff Memorial Award for Biblical and Rabbinic Scholarship: Rabbi J. Schochet, Mashiach: The Principle of Mashiach and the Messianic in Jewish Law and Tradition
Izzy and Betty Kirshenbaum Award for Yiddish: Sam Simchovitz, Stepchild on the Vistula
Jewish Book Committee Award for Creative Writing: Shel Krakofsky, The Reversible Coat
Jewish Book Committee Award for Autobiography / Memoir: Eta Fuchs Berk and Gilbert Allardyce, Chosen: A Holocaust Memoir
Jewish Book Committee Award for Historical Scholarship: Alan Davies, Anti-Semitism in Canada
Drs Andrzej and Jus Holocaust Literature Award: David Smuschkowitz, Peter Silverman, Peter Smuszkowicz From Victims to Victors
History Award: Michael R. Marrus, Mr. Sam: The Life and Times of Samuel Bronfman

1994
Penina Rubinoff Memorial Award for Biblical and Rabbinic Scholarship: Rabbi Chaim Nussbaum, Semblance and Reality
Canadian Society for Yad Vashem Award for Scholarship on a Canadian Jewish Subject: Esther Delisle, The Traitor and the Jew
Nachman Sokol Memorial Award for Canadian Jewish History: Gerald Tulchinsky, Taking Root
Henry Fuerstenberg Memorial Award for Creative Writing in Poetry: Seymour Mayne, Killing Time
Jewish Book Committee Award for Creative Writing in Fiction: Abraham Boyarsky, The Number Hall
Jewish Book Committee Award for Creative Writing in Fiction: Szloma Renglich, In the Heart of Warsaw
Jewish Book Committee Award for Journal / Memoir: Eli Rubenstein, For You Who Died I Must Live On...Reflections on the March of the Living
Joseph and Faye Tannenbaum Memorial Award for Cultural History: Ivan Kalmar, The Trotskys, Freuds and Woody Allens
Drs Andrzej and Jus Holocaust Literature Award: Ariella B. Samson, A Letter from My Father

1995
Penina Rubinoff Memorial Award for Torah Scholarship: Rabbi Aaron Levine, To Comfort the Bereaved
Canadian Society for Yad Vashem Award for Scholarship on a Canadian Jewish Subject: Andre Stein, Hidden Children; Forgotten Survivors of the Holocaust
Izzy and Betty Kirshenbaum Foundation Award for Original Translation from Yiddish: Sam Simchovitz, Stepchild on the Vistula
Izzy and Betty Kirshenbaum Foundation Award for Yiddish: Grunia Slutsky-Khon, Don't Look So Sad in the Window
Henry Fuerstenberg Memorial Award for Creative Writing in Poetry: Peter Ormshaw, The Purity of Arms
Rachel Bessin Memorial Award for Writing for Young People: Lillian Boraks-Nemetz, The Old Brown Suitcase
Jewish Book Committee Award for Fiction: Cary Fagan, The Animal's Waltz
Joseph and Faye Tannenbaum Memorial Award for Holocaust Literature: Jack Kuper, After the Smoke Cleared

1996
Betty and Morris Aaron Prize for Biography or Memoir: Eva Brewster, Progeny of Light/Vanished in Darkness
Joseph and Fay Tannenbaum Award for Canadian Jewish History: Sheldon J. Godfrey and Judith C. Godfrey, Search Out the Land: The Jews and the Growth of Equality in British Colonial America 1740-1867
Koffler Centre of the Arts President's Award for Jewish History: Erna Paris, The End of Days: A Story of Tolerance, Tyranny and the Expulsion of the Jew from Spain
Penina Rubinoff Memorial Award for Biblical Scholarship: Shoshana P. Zolty, And All Your Children Shall Be Learned
Harry and Florence Topper/ Milton Shier Prize for Original Translation from Yiddish: Frieda Forman, Ethel Raicus, Sarah Silverstein Swartz, Margie Wolfe, Found Treasures- Stories by Yiddish Women Writers
Henry Fuerstenberg Memorial Award for Creative Writing in Poetry: Shel Krakofsky, Blind Messiah
Louis Lockshin Memorial Award for Children's Literature: Gary Clement, Just Stay Put
Rachel Bessin Memorial Award for Writing for Young People: Walter Buchignani, Tell No One Who You Are
Bessie and Harry Frisch Memorial Award for Jewish Fiction: Agnes Jelhof Jensen, Dilemma
Canadian Society for Yad Vashem Award for Holocaust Literature: Eric Koch, Hilmar and Odette

1997
Joseph and Fay Tannenbaum Award for Canadian Jewish History: Yves Lavertu, The Bernonville Affair
Joseph and Fay Tannenbaum Award for Canadian Jewish History: Fraidie Martz, Open Your Hearts
Canadian Society for Yad Vashem Award in Holocaust History: Dr/ Felicia Carmelly, Shattered: 50 Years of Silence
Penina Rubinoff Memorial Award for Biblical Scholarship: Rabbi Steven Saltzman, A Small Glimmer of Light: Reflections on the Book of Genesis
Harry and Florence Topper/ Milton Shier Prize for Original Translation from Yiddish: Simcha Simchovitch, A Song Will Remain
Betty and Morris Aaron Prize for Scholarship on a Canadian Subject: Mervin Butovsky and Ira Robinson, Renewing Our Days
Henry Fuerstenberg Award for Poetry: Roger Nash, In the Kosher Chow Mein Restaurant
Louis Lockshin Memorial Award for Creative Writing in Poetry: Seymour Mayne and B. Glen Rotchin, Jerusalem
Rachel Bessin/Isaac Frischwasser Memorial Award for Young Adult Fiction: Carol Matas, After the War
Martin and Beatrice Fischer Prize for Fiction: Anne Michaels, Fugitive Pieces
Koffler Centre of the Arts President's Award for Holocaust Literature: Manny Drukier, Carved in Stone

1998
Joseph and Fay Tannenbaum Award for Canadian Jewish History: Alan Davies and Marilyn Nefsky, How Silent Were the Churches
Canadian Society for Yad Vashem Award in Holocaust History: Isabel Vincent, Hitler's Silent Partners
Morris Winemaker Prize in Literary Criticism: Norman Ravvin, A House of Words
Penina Rubinoff Memorial Award for Biblical Scholarship: Martin Lockshin, Rashbaums's Commentary on Exodus
The Jewish Book Awards Committee Prize for Memoir/Biography: Rosalie Sharp, Irving Abella, Edwin Goodman, Growing Up Jewish
Izzy and Betty Kirshenbaum Foundation Prize for Yiddish: Simcha Simchovitch, Funken in Zhar (Sparks in Embers)
Betty and Morris Aaron Prize for Scholarship on a Canadian Subject: Elizabeth Greene, We Who Can Fly
Henry Fuerstenberg Award for Poetry: Carol Rose, Behind The Blue Gate
Rachel Bessin/Isaac Frischwasser Memorial Award for Young Adult Fiction: Carol Matas, The Garden
Martin and Beatrice Fischer Award for Holocaust Literature: Régine Robin, The Wanderer
Dorothy Schoichet President's Award for Holocaust Literature: Roma Karsh, Endless
Elie Wiesel Prize in Holocaust Memoir: Elaine Kalman Naves, Journey to Vaja
Elie Wiesel Prize in Holocaust Memoir: Vera Schiff, Theresienstadt

1999
Sam Bojman Memorial Prize in Jewish History: Noah N. Shneidman, Jerusalem of Lithuania: The Rise and Fall of Jewish Vilnius, a Personal Perspective
Canadian Society for Yad Vashem Award in Holocaust History: Allan Levine, Fugitives of the Forest
Louis L Lockshin Prize for Short Fiction: Nora Gold, Marrow and Other Stories
Morris Winemaker Prize in Literary Criticism: Kenneth Sherman, Void and Voice: Essays on Literary and Historical Currents
Dorothy Shiochet President's Award for Biblical and Rabbinic Scholarship: Rabbi Elyse Goldstein, ReVisions: Seeing Torah Through a Feminist Lens
Henry Fuerstenberg Award for Poetry: Robin McGrath, Escaped Domestics
Isaac Frischwasser Memorial Award for Young Adult Fiction: Irene Watts, Goodbye Marianne
Martin and Beatrice Fischer Award in Fiction: Lilian Nattel, The River Midnight
Betty and Morris Aaron Prize for Holocaust Memoir: Elizabeth M. Raab, And Peace Never Came

2000
Louis L Lockshin Memorial Prize: Sarah Silberstein Swartz and Margie Wolfe, From Memory to Transformation: Jewish Women's Voices
The Joseph and Faye Tanenbaum Award for Canadian Jewish History: Bruce Muirhead, Against The Odds: The Public Life and Times of Louis Rasminsky
Isaac Frischwasser Prize for Holocaust Memoir: Arthur Schaller, 100 Cigarettes and a Bottle of Vodka
Dorothy Shoichet President's Prize for Feminist Jewish Literature: Adele Reinhartz, Why Ask My Name? Anonymity and Identity in Biblical Narrative
Penina Rubinoff Memorial Prize in Biblical/Rabbinic Scholarship: Shlomo Zalman Elazer Grafstein, Judaism's Bible: A New and Expanded Translation
Izzy and Betty Kirshenbaum Foundation Prize for Yiddish translation: Simcha Simchovitch, The Remnant
Henry Fuerstenberg and Betty and Morris Aaron Prize for Poetry: Seymour Mayne and B. Glen Rotchin, A Rich Garland
Henry Fuerstenberg and Betty and Morris Aaron Prize for Poetry: Malca Janice Litovitz, To Light, To Water
Fanny Lidsky Memorial Prize for Young Adult Fiction: Kathy Kacer, Gabi's Dresser
Martin and Beatrice Fischer Award in Fiction: Nancy Huston, The Mark of the Angel
Abraham and Fay Bergel Prize for Holocaust history: Naomi Kramer and Ronald Headland, The Fallacy of Race and the Shoah

2001
Dorothy Shoichet Chairperson's Award for Jewish History: Erna Paris, Long Shadows: Truth Lies and History
Louis L Lockshin Memorial Prize: Matt Cohen, Typing: A Life in 26 Keys
Canadian Jewish Book Awards Committee Prize: Al Waxman, That's What I Am
The Joseph and Faye Tanenbaum Award for Canadian Jewish History: Frank Bialystok, Delayed Impact: The Holocaust and the Canadian Jewish Community
Martin and Beatrice Fischer First Novel Award: Michael Kaufman, The Possibility of Dreaming on a Night Without Stars
Penina Rubinoff Memorial Prize in Biblical Scholarship: Barry Dov Walfish, Apples of Gold in Settings of Silver
Morris Winemaker Prize in Scholarship on a Jewish Theme: Howard Margolian, Unauthorized Entry: The Truth about Nazi War criminals in Canada 1946-1956
Izzy and Betty Kirshenbaum Foundation Prize for Yiddish: Vivian Felsen. Montreal of Yesterday
Henry Fuerstenberg / Betty and Morris Aaron Poetry Award: Karen Shenfeld, The Law of Return
Isaac Frischwasser Memorial Award for Young Adult Fiction: Irene Watts, Remember Me
The Canadian Society for Yad Vashem Award in Holocaust History: FC Decoste and Bernard Schwartz, The Holocaust's Ghost
Laks-Wajsfus Prize in World Jewish Culture: Dorion Liebgott, Art and Tradition
Abraham and Fay Bergel Prize for Holocaust Memoir: Gitel Donath, My Bones Don't Rest in Auschwitz

2002
The Abraham and Fay Bergel Prize in Scholarship on a Jewish Subject: Morton Weinfeld, Like Everyone Else- But Different
The Koffler Centre Presidents' Award for Biography/Memoir: William Weintraub, Getting Started
The Joseph and Faye Tanenbaum Prize in Canadian Jewish History: Janine Stingel, Social Discredit
The Nachman Sokol-Mollie Halberstadt Prize in Biblical Scholarship: Eric Lawee, Isaac Abarbanel's Stance Toward Tradition
The Izzy and Betty Kirshenbaum Foundation Award in Yiddish: Simcha Simchovich, The Song That Never Died
The Betty and Morris Aaron-Henry Fuerstenberg Poetry Prize: Joseph Sherman, American Standard
The Isaac Frischwasser Memorial Award in Children's Literature: Cary Fagan, The Market Wedding
Martin and Beatrice Fischer Award in Fiction: Emma Richler, Sister Crazy
The Canadian Society for Yad Vashem Award in Holocaust Memoir: Rabbi Erwin Schild. The Very Narrow Bridge

2003
The Jack Chisvin Family Award in Holocaust Memoir: Joil Alpern, No One Awaiting Me: Two Brothers Defy Death During the Holocaust in Romania
The Abraham and Fay Bergel Prize in Scholarship on a Jewish Subject: Adrienne Kertzner, My Mother's Voice: Children, Literature and the Holocaust
The Koffler Centre Presidents' Prize in History: Henry T. Aubin, The Rescue of Jerusalem: the Alliance Between Hebrews and Africans in 701 BC
The Joseph and Faye Tanenbaum Prize in Canadian Jewish History: Theresa and Albert Moritz, The World's Most Dangerous Woman: A New Biography of Emma Goldman
The Nachman Sokol-Mollie Halberstadt Prize in Biblical/Rabbinic Scholarship: James Diamond, Maimonides and the Hermeneutics of Concealment
The Izzy and Betty Kirshenbaum Foundation Award in Yiddish Translation: Pierre Anctil, Le Montreal Juif Entre les Deux Guerres
The Louis Lockshin - Frances and Samuel Stein Memorial Award in Biography/Memoir: Vivian Kaplan, Ten Green Bottles: Vienna to Shanghai, Journey of Hope and Fear
The Betty and Morris Aaron - Henry Fuerstenberg Memorial Prize in Poetry: Ron Charach, Dungenessque
The Isaac Frischwasser Memorial Award in Children's Literature: Karen Levine, Hana's Suitcase
Martin and Beatrice Fischer Award in Fiction: Nancy Richler, Your Mouth is Lovely
The Canadian Society for Yad Vashem Award in Holocaust Studies: N.N. Shneidman. The Three Tragic Heroes of the Vilnius Ghetto: Witenberg, Sheinbaum, Gens

2004
The Jack Chisvin Family Award in Holocaust Memoir: Henry Schogt, The Curtain: Witness and Memory in Wartime Holland
The Joseph and Faye Tanenbaum Prize in Scholarship on a Jewish Subject: Loren Lerner, Afterimage: Evocations of the Holocaust in Contemporary Canadian Arts and Literature
The Nachman Sokol-Chaim Yoel and Mollie Halberstadt Prize in Yiddish/ Translation from Yiddish: Simcha Simchovitch, Dem Netzach Antkegn: Gezamlte Lider and Out of the Abyss: Collected Poems
The Louis Lockshin - Frances and Samuel Stein Memorial Award in Biography/Memoir: Joel Yanofsky, Mordecai & Me: an Appreciation of a Kind
The Betty and Morris Aaron - Henry and Regina Fuerstenberg Memorial Prize in Poetry: Merle Nudelman, Borrowed Light
The Canadian Jewish News Prize in Children's literature: Aubrey Davis, Bagels From Benny
Martin and Beatrice Fischer Award in Fiction: Kate Taylor, Mme. Proust and the Kosher Kitchen
The Canadian Society for Yad Vashem Award in Holocaust Studies: Lillian Boraks-Nemetz and Irene Watts, Tapestry of Hope: Holocaust Writing for Young People
The Isaac Frischwasser Memorial Award in Holocaust Literature: Ruth Mandel. How to Tell Your Children about the Holocaust

2005
The Jack Chisvin Family Award in Holocaust Memoir: Jack Weiss, Memories, Dreams and Nightmares
The Nachman Sokol-Chaim Yoel and Mollie Halberstadt Award in Biblical/ Rabbinic Scholarship: Martin Lockshin, Rashbam's Commentary on Deuteronomy
Abe and Fay Bergel Award in Scholarship on a Jewish Subject: Richarda Menkis and Norman Ravin, The Canadian Jewish Studies Reader
Abraham and Eve Trapunski Prize in Yiddish Literature and Translation from Yiddish: Chava Rosenfarb and Goldie Morgentaler, Survivors
The Presidents' Award in History: Warren Bass, Support Any Friend
The Joseph and Faye Tanenbaum Prize in Canadian Jewish History: Jill Culiner, Finding Home
Jack Chisvin Family Award in Biography/Memoir: James Laxer, Red Diaper Baby
Canadian Jewish News Prize in Poetry: Isa Milman, Between the Doorposts
Frances and Samuel Stein Memorial Award in Children's Literature: Anne Dublin, Bobbie Rosenfeld
Martin and Beatrice Fischer Award in Fiction: David Bezmozgis, Natasha and Other Stories
The Yad Vashem Award in Holocaust Memoir: Elaine K Naves, Shoshanna's Story
The Betty and Morris Aaron, Isaac Frischwasser, Louis L.Lockshin Memorial Prize in Holocaust Literature: Lisa Appignanesi. The Memory Man

2006
The Canadian Society for Yad Vashem Prize in Holocaust History: Sara Ginaite-Rubinson, Resistance and Survival
The Jack Chisvin Family Award in Holocaust Memoir: Jack Weiss, Memories, Dreams and Nightmares
The Nachman Sokol-Chaim Yoel and Mollie Halberstadt Award in Biblical/ Rabbinic Scholarship: Eliezer Segal, From Sermon to Commentary: Expounding the Bible in Talmudic Babylonia
Abe and Fay Bergel Award in Scholarship on a Jewish Subject: Richarda Menkis and Norman Ravin, The Canadian Jewish Studies Reader
Abraham and Eve Trapunski Prize in Yiddish Literature and Translation from Yiddish: Mervin Butovsky and Ode Garfinkle, The Journals of Yaacov Zipper 1950-82
The Isaac Frischwasser - Louis L. Lockshin Memorial Award in Poetry: Renee Norman, True Confessions
The Louis L. Lockshin and Brenda Freedman Memorial Prize in Poetry: Seymour Mayne, September Rain
Canadian Jewish News Award in Biography/Memoir: Michael Posner, The Last Honest Man: Mordecai Richler, an Oral Biography
Frances and Samuel Stein Memorial Award in Youth Literature: Lynne Kositsky, The Thought of High Windows
Martin and Beatrice Fischer Award in Fiction: Edeet Ravel, A Wall of Light
Canadian Society for Yad Vashem Award in Holocaust Memoir and Literature: Henia Reinhartz, Bits and Pieces

2007
 The Canadian Society for Yad Vashem Prize in Holocaust History: Rosemary Sullivan, Villa Air-Bel
 The Jack Chisvin Family Award in Holocaust Memoir/Literature: Bernice Eisenstein, I Was a Child of Holocaust Survivors
 Abe and Fay Bergel Award in Scholarship on a Jewish Subject: Michael Wex, Born To Kvetch: Yiddish Language and Culture in All of Its Moods
 Abraham and Eve Trapunski Prize in Yiddish Literature and Translation from Yiddish: Shirley Kumove, Drunk From the Bitter Truth; The Poems of Anna Margolin
 Canadian Jewish News Award in Poetry: Rafi Aaron, Surviving the Censor: The Unspoken Words of Osip Mandelstam
 Frances and Samuel Stein Memorial Award in Youth Literature: Carol Matas, Turned Away: The World War II Diary of Devora Bernstein
 Martin and Beatrice Fischer Award in Fiction: Susan Glickman, The Violin Lover
 Canadian Society for Yad Vashem Award in Holocaust Memoir and Literature: Henia Reinhartz, Bits and Pieces
 The Joseph and Faye Tanenbaum Prize in Biography/Memoir: Eric Koch, I Remember the Location - Exactly

2008
Joseph and Faye Tanenbaum Prize in History: Anna Porter, Kasztner's Train: The True Story of Rezsö Kasztner, Unknown Hero of the Holocaust
Abe and Fay Bergel Award in Scholarship on a Jewish Subject: James Diamond, Converts, Heretics, and Lepers: Maimonides and the Outsider
Abraham and Eve Trapunski Prize in Yiddish Literature and Translation from Yiddish: Marc Miller, Representing the Immigrant Experience: Morris Rosenfeld and the Emergence of Yiddish Literature in America
Canadian Jewish News Award in Poetry: Ruth Panofsky, Laike and Nahum: A Poem in Two Voices
Frances and Samuel Stein Memorial Award in Youth Literature: Tina Grimberg, Out of Line: Growing up Soviet
Martin and Beatrice Fischer Award in Fiction: John Miller, A Sharp Intake of Breath
Canadian Society for Yad Vashem Award in Holocaust Memoir and Literature: Henia Reinhartz, Bits and Pieces
Samuel and Rose Cohen Memorial Award in Biography/Memoir: Mayer Kirshenblatt and Barbara Kirshenblatt-Gimblett, They Called Me Mayer July: Painted Memories of a Jewish Childhood in Poland Before the Holocaust

2009
Biography and Memoir: Peter C. Newman, Izzy: the Passionate Life and Turbulent Times of Izzy Asper, Canada's Media Mogul
Fiction: Ami Sands Brodoff, The White Space Between
History: Barrie Wilson, How Jesus Became Christian
Holocaust Literature: Joseph Kertes, Gratitude
Poetry: Isa Milman, Prairie Kaddish
Scholarship on a Jewish Subject: Reinhold Kramer, Mordecai Richler: Leaving St. Urbain
Yiddish Literature: David G. Roskies, Yiddishlands: A Memoir
Youth Literature: Kathy Kacer, The Diary of Laura's Twin

2010
Fiction: Robin McGrath, The Winterhouse
History: Allan Levine, Coming of Age: A History of the Jewish People of Manitoba
Holocaust Literature: Michael R. Marrus, Some Measure of Justice: The Holocaust Era Restitution Campaign of the 1990s
Youth Literature: Eva Wiseman, Puppet
Biography and Memoir: David Sax, Save the Deli
Jewish Thought and Culture: Kenneth Sherman, What the Furies Bring
Scholarship on a Jewish Subject: Jeffrey Veidlinger, Jewish Public Culture in the Late Russian Empire
Yiddish Literature: Goldie Sigal, Stingy Buzi and King Solomon
Special Achievement Award: Howard Engel

2011
Fiction: Alison Pick, Far to Go
Politics and History: Tarek Fatah, The Jew Is Not My Enemy
Holocaust Literature: Robert Eli Rubinstein, An Italian Renaissance: Choosing Life in Canada
Biography and Memoir: Charles Foran, Mordecai: The Life and Times
Scholarship: Harold Troper, The Defining Decade: Identity, Politics, and the Canadian Jewish Community in the 1960s
Youth Literature: Judie Oron, Cry of the Giraffe

2012
Biography: Fraidie Martz and Andrew Wilson, A Fiery Soul: The Life and Theatrical Times of John Hirsch
Fiction: David Bezmozgis, The Free World
History: Denis Vaugeois, Les Premiers Juifs d'Amérique 1760-1860: L'extraordinaire histoire de la famille Hart
Holocaust Literature: Eli Pfefferkorn, The Muselmann at the Water Cooler
Memoir: Richard Marceau, Juif, Une histoire québécoise
Poetry: S. Weilbach, Singing from the Darktime: A Childhood Memoir in Poetry and Prose
Scholarship: Kalman Weiser, Jewish People, Yiddish Nation: Noah Prylucki and the Folkists in Poland
Yiddish Literature: Rebecca Margolis, Jewish Roots, Canadian Soil: Yiddish Culture in Montreal, 1905-1945
Youth Literature: Lesley Simpson, Yuvi's Candy Tree

2013
Biography: Aili and Andres McConnon, Road to Valour: A True Story of World War II Italy, the Nazis, and the Cyclist Who Inspired a Nation (Doubleday)
Fiction: Nancy Richler, The Imposter Bride (Harper Collins)
History: Matti Friedman, The Aleppo Codex: A True Story of Obsession, Faith, and the Pursuit of an Ancient Bible (Algonquin Books)
Holocaust Literature: Julija Šukys, Epistolophilia: Writing the Life of Ona Simaite (University of Nebraska Press)
Poetry: Isa Milman, Something Small To Carry Home (Quattro Books)
Scholarship: L. Ruth Klein, Nazi Germany, Canadian Responses: Confronting Antisemitism in the Shadow of War (McGill-Queen's University Press)
Yiddish: Pierre Anctil, Jacob-Isaac Segal 1869-1954, Un poète yiddish de Montréal et son milieu (Presses de l'Université Laval)
Children and Youth Literature: Sharon E. McKay, Enemy Territory (Annick Press)

2014
Holocaust Literature: Ken Setterington, Branded by the Pink Triangle (Second Story Press)
Fiction: Kenneth Bonert, The Lion Seeker (Knopf Canada)
Yiddish: Frieda Forman, The Exile Book of Yiddish Women Writers (Exile Editions)
Jewish Thought and Culture: Josh Lambert, Unclean Lips: Obscenity, Jews, and American Culture (New York University Press)
Poetry: Anne Michaels, Poetry, and Bernice Eisenstein, Portraits, Correspondences (McClelland and Stewart)
Scholarship: Albert Kaganovitch, The Long Life and Swift Death of the Jewish Reschitsa (The University of Wisconsin Press)
Biography/Memoir: Renée Levine Melammed, An Ode to Salonika: The Ladino Verses of Bouena Sarfatty (Indiana University Press)
Youth: Carol Matas, Dear Canada: Pieces of the Past: The Holocaust Diary of Rose Rabinowitz, Winnipeg, Manitoba, 1948 (Scholastic)
History: Jeffrey Veidlinger, In the Shadow of the Shtetl (Indiana University Press)

2015 (as the Canadian Jewish Literary Awards) 
 Novel: Nora Gold, Fields of Exile (Dundurn Press).
 Scholarship: James A. Diamond, Maimonides and the Shaping of the Jewish Canon (Cambridge University Press).
 Biography/Memoir: Alison Pick, Between Gods: A Memoir (Doubleday Canada).
 History: Joseph Hodes, From India to Israel: Identity, Immigration, and the Struggle for Religious Equality (McGill-Queen's University Press).
 Youth Literature: Suri Rosen, Playing with Matches (ECW Press).
 Poetry: Robyn Sarah, My Shoes Are Killing Me (Biblioasis).
 Holocaust Literature: Beverley Chalmers, Birth, Sex and Abuse: Women's Voices Under Nazi Rule (Grosvenor House).
 Short Fiction: Mireille Silcoff, Chez l'Arabe (House of Anansi).
 Yiddish: Ruth Panofsky, The Collected Poems of Miriam Waddington: A Critical Edition (University of Ottawa Press).

2016 
 Novel: Sigal Samuel, The Mystics of Mile End (Freehand Books).
 Scholarship: Sarah Phillips Casteel, Calypso Jews: Jewishness in the Caribbean Literary Imagination (Columbia University Press).
 Biography/Memoir: Howard Akler, Men of Action (Doubleday Canada).
 History: Michael Marrus, Lessons of the Holocaust (University of Toronto Press).
 Youth Literature: Anne Dublin, 44 Hours or Strike! (Second Story Press).
 Holocaust Literature: Agata Tuszyńska, A Family History of Fear (Knopf Canada).
 Yiddish: Helen Mintz, translator, Vilna, My Vilna: Stories by Abraham Karpinowitz (Syracuse University Press).
 Jewish Thought and Culture: Julia Creet, Sara R. Horowitz and Amira Bojadzija-Dan, editors, H.G. Adler: Life, Literature, Legacy (Northwestern University Press).

2017 
 Novel: Gary Barwin, Yiddish for Pirates (Vintage Canada).
 Scholarship: Joel Hecker, The Zohar: Pritzker Edition, Vol 11 (Stanford University Press).
 Biography/Memoir: Matti Friedman, Pumpkinflowers: A Soldier's Story (Signal/McClelland & Stewart).
 History: Roger Frie, Not In My Family: German Memory and Responsibility After the Holocaust (Oxford University Press).
 Youth Literature: Eva Wiseman, Another Me (Tundra Books).
 Poetry: Stuart Ross, A Sparrow Came Down Resplendent (Wolsak & Wynn).
 Holocaust Literature: Myrna Goldenberg, editor, Before All Memory Is Lost: Women's Voices from the Holocaust (Azrieli Foundation).
 Yiddish: Rachel Seelig, Strangers in Berlin: Modern Jewish Literature Between East and West 1919-1933 (University of Michigan Press).
 Jewish Thought and Culture: Chantal Ringuet and Gérard Rabinovitch, editors, Les révolutions de Leonard Cohen (Presses de l'Université du Québec).

See also 

 Vine Awards for Canadian Jewish Literature
 National Jewish Book Award
 List of winners of the National Jewish Book Award

References

External links 
 Vine Awards for Canadian Jewish Literature
 Canadian Jewish Literary Awards

Canadian literary awards
Jewish Canadian literature
Jewish literary awards